Abdul Gafoor Khan Mayo is the current Food Minister for Punjab, Pakistan. He has been elected to the Provincial Assembly of the Punjab three times. Gafoor Mayo has also repeatedly been in the news. Once, he was charged with manhandling custom officials at Lahore airport. Earlier during his second tenure as MPA in 1997, he was in newspapers for beating police officer at Mall Road. Abdul Ghafoor Mayo is notoriously famous for short temper. He usually exchanges harsh words with opponents and at times even tries to go physical. He has been elected three times to Provincial Assembly, once from Nawaz Sharif home constituency Model Town, and later on from other home constituency of Nawaz Sharif that is Raiwind.

References

External links 
 'Talent' award for prisons minister (The News International)
 'Toys play important role in mental growth' (Business Recorder)

Living people
Punjab MPAs 1997–1999
Punjab MPAs 2013–2018
Year of birth missing (living people)